Juan Castillo Brayas (born January 25, 1962) is a former professional baseball player. He played all or part of four seasons in Major League Baseball from 1986 until 1989, all for the Milwaukee Brewers. His primary position was second base, but he also played a good deal at third base and shortstop.

Castillo was originally signed as an amateur free agent in 1979 by the Brewers. He played in their organization for his entire career until he became a free agent once again in 1989. After playing in the Cleveland Indians organization in 1990, he returned to the Brewers to start the 1991 season. He finished the year with the Rieleros de Aguascalientes of the Mexican League, and continued to play on and off in Mexico until 1998.

Castillo has one daughter and three sons and lives in Miami, Florida, with his wife and two youngest sons.

References

External links

1962 births
Broncos de Reynosa players
Burlington Bees players
Butte Copper Kings players
Colorado Springs Sky Sox players
Denver Zephyrs players
Dominican Republic expatriate baseball players in Canada
Dominican Republic expatriate baseball players in Mexico
Dominican Republic expatriate baseball players in the United States
El Paso Diablos players
Guerreros de Oaxaca players
Langosteros de Quintana Roo players

Living people
Major League Baseball players from the Dominican Republic
Major League Baseball second basemen
Mexican League baseball managers 
Milwaukee Brewers players
Sportspeople from San Pedro de Macorís
Rieleros de Aguascalientes players
Stockton Ports players
Utica Blue Jays players
Vancouver Canadians players